Sunset Beach is a seaside town in Brunswick County, North Carolina, United States. The population was 3,572 at the 2010 census, up from 1,824 in 2000. It is part of the Myrtle Beach metropolitan area.

History
The seaside town of Sunset Beach got its start in 1955 when the land it occupies was bought by a property developer. Development began in earnest with the completion of a bridge connecting the beach island to the mainland in 1958. Sunset Beach was incorporated as a town in 1963. On February 15, 2021, an EF3 tornado hit the north side of town around midnight, damaging multiple homes in several neighborhoods, including some that were completely destroyed. Three people were killed and 10 others were injured.

Geography
Sunset Beach is located in southwestern Brunswick County at  (33.885348, -78.507528). It is the last developed Atlantic Ocean beach before the South Carolina border. One-third of the town's area occupies a barrier island between the ocean and the Intracoastal Waterway; the remainder of the town extends onto the mainland to the north. Undeveloped Bird Island is directly to the west, Calabash is the closest town to the west on the mainland, and Ocean Isle Beach is to the east.

Demographics

2020 census

As of the 2020 United States census, there were 4,175 people, 2,014 households, and 1,289 families residing in the town.

2000 census
As of the census of 2000, there were 1,824 people, 909 households, and 678 families residing in the town. The population density was 360.9 people per square mile (139.5/km). There were 2,983 housing units at an average density of 590.3 per square mile (228.1/km). The racial makeup of the town was 97.37% White, 0.49% African American, 0.38% Native American, 0.38% Asian, 0.27% from other races, and 1.10% from two or more races. Hispanic or Latino of any race were 1.37% of the population.

There were 909 households, out of which 7.6% had children under the age of 18 living with them, 70.0% were married couples living together, 3.3% had a female householder with no husband present, and 25.4% were non-families. 21.3% of all households were made up of individuals, and 9.2% had someone living alone who was 65 years of age or older. The average household size was 2.01 and the average family size was 2.28.

In the town, the population was spread out, with 6.9% under the age of 18, 2.7% from 18 to 24, 12.1% from 25 to 44, 43.6% from 45 to 64, and 34.7% who were 65 years of age or older. The median age was 60 years. For every 100 females, there were 97.2 males. For every 100 females age 18 and over, there were 95.2 males.

The median income for a household in the town was $47,356, and the median income for a family was $57,019. Males had a median income of $40,795 versus $27,708 for females. The per capita income for the town was $36,181. About 3.0% of families and 4.2% of the population were below the poverty line, including 3.5% of those under age 18 and 3.2% of those age 65 or over.

Sunset Beach Bridge 

Since most of Sunset Beach and the adjoining Bird Island coastal reserve encompass a barrier island, the only way to get there from the mainland was by crossing a pontoon bridge (swing bridge) straddling the Intracoastal Waterway and adjacent marshland. It was a wooden structure that could only hold one lane of traffic at any given time, and was the only one of its kind still in use along the East Coast until 2010. During the day in the summer, traffic would be stopped every hour, on the hour, and the bridge would open to boat traffic on the waterway for 10 minutes. At 10 minutes after the hour, every hour, the bridge would reopen for vehicular traffic again for 50 minutes. During the off-season, the bridge only opened at the request of boat traffic. While this caused headaches for those trying to get on or off the island, many locals said the bridge did, however, give the town a more relaxed feel. Historically, this had been in stark contrast to the rapid growth affecting other beach communities along the Grand Strand.

In February 2008 the NCDOT started construction to replace the old bridge with a modern,  arc bridge (non-draw, non-swing). The bridge opened November 11, 2010. The old Sunset Beach pontoon swing bridge was saved by the Old Bridge Preservation Society which plans to create a museum celebrating the old bridge and the town's history. The new bridge eliminates the need for a bridge keeper and provides for a continual flow of vehicle traffic on and off the island, and water traffic on the Intracoastal Waterway.

Housing in Sunset Beach
The town consists of both mainland neighborhoods and a barrier island of approximately 1,200 homes. Three of the larger mainland neighborhoods in the town are golf course developments at Oyster Bay, Sea Trail Resort and Sandpiper Bay. Ocean Ridge Plantation, while not in the town limits, has one of its "sister communities" in Sunset Beach's ETJ. Ocean Ridge has an amenities center/clubhouse on the island, while Sea Trail Home Owners Association has a designated parking lot for members. The island is primarily home to vacation rental homes and cottages, although there are close to 100 full-time residents as well.

References
 The Old Bridge has been moved and is now a museum and gift shop, sitting almost directly under the new Mannon C. Gore bridge.

External links
 
 
 
 Town of Sunset Beach official website
 Visitors' website
 SunsetBeach InsiderInfo.us Area Guide
 Pictures of Sunset Beach Pontoon Bridge
 Old Bridge Preservation Society

Towns in Brunswick County, North Carolina
Towns in North Carolina
Beaches of North Carolina
Barrier islands of North Carolina
Landforms of Brunswick County, North Carolina
Populated coastal places in North Carolina